Ōyachi Station may refer to:

 Ōyachi Station (Hokkaido), a train station in Hokkaido, Japan
 Ōyachi Station (Mie), a train station in Mie Prefecture, Japan